Polysius AG is a German company and subsidiary of ThyssenKrupp Technologies that manufactures cement plants and builds cement mills, cement kilns, cement factory automation systems and ore grinding facilities. Polysius is active around the world, constructing, installing and managing cement and ore processing plants.

In spring 1859, master machinist Andreas Ernst Gottfried Polysius opened his own workshop in Dessau, thereby laying the foundations for Polysius AG. In 1870, he set up the G. Polysius iron foundry and engineering works, which soon became a designer and manufacturer of mills for the burgeoning construction materials industry. By 1890, the founder's heirs were working on the company's 100th mill contract. 
From that time onwards, Polysius specialised in machines for crushing, grinding and dressing/processing raw materials, as well as in the construction of cement works. In 1898, the company built Europe's first rotary kiln and in 1907 constructed a complete cement factory in Egypt. 

In the late 1920s, Georg Lellep invented the LEPOL process. This revolutionised conventional cement production, significantly improving the burning process in the rotary kiln and reducing fuel consumption by a third. 

In 1946, after the Second World War, Polysius made a fresh start in Dessau. At the same time, Curt Prüssing, a member of the Polysius family, formed Westpol GmbH in Beckum. Three years later, the company was renamed Polysius GmbH. Business quickly picked up, especially exports. Ten years after the new start, Polysius employed 600 people in Germany and 100 abroad.

In 1971, the Essen-based company Fried. Krupp GmbH acquired a majority share-holding in Polysius. In 1992, Polysius AG was integrated into the Krupp Plant Construction Division of Fried. Krupp AG Hoesch-Krupp.

Locations
Polysius is based in Beckum, Germany; the company has subsidiaries on every continent.

External links
Thyssenkrupp website
 

Engineering companies of Germany
Manufacturing companies of Germany
Companies based in North Rhine-Westphalia